Krabbé is a surname, and may refer to:

Hendrik Maarten Krabbé, or Heinrich Martin Krabbé (1868–1931), Dutch artist
Jeroen Krabbé (born 1944), Dutch actor
Maarten Krabbé (1908-2005), Dutch painter
Martijn Krabbé (born 1968), Dutch TV presenter
Tim Krabbé (born 1943), Dutch journalist

See also
Krabbe

.